Ben Vorlich is a mountain in the Arrochar Alps of Argyll, in the Southern Highlands of Scotland. It reaches , making it a Munro. It lies between Loch Lomond and Loch Sloy. Ben Vorlich is the highest point of the historic county of Dunbartonshire.

The A82 road and the West Highland railway line run on the eastern side of Ben Vorlich, above the shoreline of Loch Lomond.

The peak forms a north–south ridge on the western side of Loch Lomond, with a subsidiary ridge known as Little Hills running from the summit east down to the shores of the loch. There are three small summits around 800 m apart along the main ridge; the central one is the highest, though the southern one has a trig point.

References

Munros
Marilyns of Scotland
Mountains and hills of the Southern Highlands
Sites of Special Scientific Interest in Dumbarton and North Glasgow
Protected areas of Argyll and Bute
Highest points of historic Scottish counties
Mountains and hills of Argyll and Bute